Lea Desandre (born 1993) is a French-Italian mezzo-soprano.

Biography
Born in 1993, as a small child she first became interested in dance but at 12, prompted by her music teacher, she joined the children's choir of the Paris Opéra. Her first model was Natalie Dessay, of whom she admits to be "a superfan". Taking advantage of the availability of reduced price tickets aimed at her age range, she attended performances featuring her idol Natalie Dessay. "Thanks to these reduced price tickets I was able to go about Paris to feed myself with music" she has said. She also frequented places where her favourite opera stars got together, some of which usually gave her advice, lured by her teenage charm. She enrolled at the Boulogne-Billancourt Music School under Esthel Durand and went later to Venice to study with contralto Sara Mingardo. "She received me at her house and told me: we'll read scores and will thus end by finding who you are", comments Miss Desandre.

Career

In 2013, Lea Desandre won first prize at the "Promising Youths" contest of the Grand Théâtre in Bordeaux. After joining the Lyric Workshop of L'Opera Fuoco", in 2014 she made her debut as solo singer at the Théâtre des Champs Elysées. When she turned 20, William Christie laid eyes on her and in 2015 had her join his "Garden of Voices" ensemble (Jardin des Voix, Les Arts Florissants Academy for young voices). After further study under Sara Mingardo, Valérie Guillorit and Véronique Gens, she joined Christie's main group, Les Arts Florissants, and travelled with them to Shanghai for the first Baroque Festival held over there.

After graduating with Honours in the Jardin des Voix 7th promotion or class, from 2015 onwards she studied with William Christie himself and Paul Agnew, specialising in italian baroque singing. She has travelled all over the world with Christie's teams, who recommended her to wear silicone masks to protect her vocal chords from aeroplane air conditioning in long flights.

She made her operatic debut in 2016, singing Cherubini's Medea, and was awarded the HSBC Prize at the Aix-en-Provance Opera Festival. In February the following year she was recognised as "Revelation Lyric Artist" at the "Victoires de la musique classique 2017" event. In 2018 she won the "Young Soloist Prize" awarded yearly by the four major french-language publicly owned broadcasters.

As a baroque mezzo, she none the less does not want to be typecast as just a 17th Century specialist: "I want to enlarge my répertoire, and my next engagements sort of bite into the classic period", she says. She was hired to sing Despina in the 2020 Salzburg Festival, and in 2022 sang Cherubino at the Paris Opéra, a debut highly expected by critics and reviewers. She participated in the 2022 edition of the yearly 14th July Concert held at the Champ the Mars in Paris, honouring France's National Day.

Discography
2017 : L'Orfeo, DVD-Blu-ray box, in the rôles of Messaggiera and Speranza
2017 : "Berenice, che fai?" by Lea Desandre, Natalie Perez and Chantal Santon-Jeffery, with the ensemble Opera Fuoco led by David Stern
2018 : Handel: Italian Cantatas. Sabine Devieilhe and Lea Desandre, with Le Concert d'Astrée conducted by par Emmanuelle Haïm (Erato Warner Classics)
2018 : Cities II, with guitarist Thibault Cauvin (Sony Classical)
2019 : Vivaldi (concerti and airs from his oratorios) with the Ensemble Jupiter and lutenist Thomas Dunford (Alpha)
2019 : L'incoronazione di Poppea, CD-DVD box as Amor and Valletto
2019 : Orphée et Eurydice, Blu-ray disc, as l'Amour
2020 : Vespro della Beata Vergine, DVD
2020 : Stravaganza d'Amore!, DVD
2020 : Orphée aux Enfers, Blu-ray disc, as Vénus
2021 : Così fan tutte, DVD, as Despina
2021 : Amazone, CD, with Thomas Dunford and the Ensemble Jupiter
2021 : Hippolyte et Aricie, Blu-ray disc Diane priestess, shepherdess, and hunter

References

External links

 

1993 births
Living people
21st-century French women opera singers
Chevaliers of the Ordre des Arts et des Lettres
French operatic mezzo-sopranos
Italian operatic mezzo-sopranos
Articles containing video clips